Fayazi (also Romanized as Fayāzī, Fayyāzī, and Fayyāẕī; also known as Faiyeh) is a village in Bahmanshir-e Shomali Rural District, in the Central District of Abadan County, Khuzestan Province, Iran. At the 2006 census, its population was 1,893, in 305 families.

References 

Populated places in Abadan County